The 2005–06 Detroit Pistons season was the 65th season of the franchise, the 58th in the National Basketball Association (NBA), and the 49th in the Detroit area. The team entered the season as the two-time defending Eastern Conference champions. The Pistons began the season hoping to improve upon their 54–28 output from the previous season and have another chance of going to the NBA Finals after losing to the San Antonio Spurs in last season's NBA Finals in seven games. They bested it by ten games, finishing 64–18—their best record in franchise history—and qualifying for the playoff for the fifth straight season. The Pistons defeated the Milwaukee Bucks in five games in the first round, and the Cleveland Cavaliers in a tough, hard-fought seven-game series to reach the Eastern Conference Finals for the fourth consecutive year before losing to the eventual NBA champions Miami Heat, whom they had beaten in a seven-game playoff series the year before. Detroit's offseason was soon marked by the departure of star defensive player Ben Wallace, who signed a free-agent deal with the Chicago Bulls.

For the season, the Pistons had a new logo, and, though they kept the uniforms, the horse logo was replaced by the letter 'P' on the left side of the shorts, they added new red road alternate uniforms with blue side panels to their jerseys and shorts, their alternate uniforms remained in used until 2009, while the logo and uniforms lasted until 2017.

Ben Wallace won his fourth and final Defensive Player of the Year Award and he along with Rasheed Wallace, Richard Hamilton, and Chauncey Billups were selected as reserves for the 2006 NBA All-Star Game.

Draft picks

Roster

Regular season

Season standings

Record vs. opponents

Game log

Playoffs

|- align="center" bgcolor="#ccffcc"
| 1
| April 23
| Milwaukee
| W 92–74
| Rasheed Wallace (22)
| Ben Wallace (17)
| Chauncey Billups (7)
| The Palace of Auburn Hills22,076
| 1–0
|- align="center" bgcolor="#ccffcc"
| 2
| April 26
| Milwaukee
| W 109–98
| Tayshaun Prince (22)
| Ben Wallace (11)
| Richard Hamilton (8)
| The Palace of Auburn Hills22,076
| 2–0
|- align="center" bgcolor="#ffcccc"
| 3
| April 29
| @ Milwaukee
| L 104–124
| Chauncey Billups (26)
| Antonio McDyess (8)
| Chauncey Billups (6)
| Bradley Center18,717
| 2–1
|- align="center" bgcolor="#ccffcc"
| 4
| May 1
| @ Milwaukee
| W 109–99
| Chauncey Billups (34)
| Antonio McDyess (11)
| Tayshaun Prince (7)
| Bradley Center16,296
| 3–1
|- align="center" bgcolor="#ccffcc"
| 5
| May 3
| Milwaukee
| W 122–93
| Richard Hamilton (40)
| Ben Wallace (14)
| Chauncey Billups (8)
| The Palace of Auburn Hills22,076
| 4–1
|-

|- align="center" bgcolor="#ccffcc"
| 1
| May 7
| Cleveland
| W 113–86
| Tayshaun Prince (24)
| Ben Wallace (11)
| Chauncey Billups (10)
| The Palace of Auburn Hills22,076
| 1–0
|- align="center" bgcolor="#ccffcc"
| 2
| May 9
| Cleveland
| W 97–91
| Rasheed Wallace (29)
| Ben Wallace (15)
| Chauncey Billups (7)
| The Palace of Auburn Hills22,076
| 2–0
|- align="center" bgcolor="#ffcccc"
| 3
| May 13
| @ Cleveland
| L 77–86
| Richard Hamilton (22)
| Ben Wallace (13)
| Billups, Hamilton (5)
| Gund Arena20,562
| 2–1
|- align="center" bgcolor="#ffcccc"
| 4
| May 15
| @ Cleveland
| L 72–74
| Richard Hamilton (30)
| Ben Wallace (10)
| Chauncey Billups (7)
| Gund Arena20,562
| 2–2
|- align="center" bgcolor="#ffcccc"
| 5
| May 17
| Cleveland
| L 84–86
| Tayshaun Prince (21)
| Ben Wallace (13)
| Chauncey Billups (5)
| The Palace of Auburn Hills22,076
| 2–3
|- align="center" bgcolor="#ccffcc"
| 6
| May 19
| @ Cleveland
| W 84–82
| Rasheed Wallace (24)
| Ben Wallace (10)
| Billups, Wallace (4)
| Gund Arena20,562
| 3–3
|- align="center" bgcolor="#ccffcc"
| 7
| May 21
| Cleveland
| W 79–61
| Tayshaun Prince (20)
| Ben Wallace (9)
| Billups, Prince (3)
| The Palace of Auburn Hills22,076
| 4–3
|-

|- align="center" bgcolor="#ffcccc"
| 1
| May 23
| Miami
| L 86–91
| Richard Hamilton (22)
| Ben Wallace (14)
| Chauncey Billups (7)
| The Palace of Auburn Hills22,076
| 0–1
|- align="center" bgcolor="#ccffcc"
| 2
| May 25
| Miami
| W 92–88
| Tayshaun Prince (24)
| Ben Wallace (12)
| Chauncey Billups (8)
| The Palace of Auburn Hills22,076
| 1–1
|- align="center" bgcolor="#ffcccc"
| 3
| May 27
| @ Miami
| L 83–98
| Chauncey Billups (31)
| Rasheed Wallace (10)
| Tayshaun Prince (4)
| American Airlines Arena20,245
| 1–2
|- align="center" bgcolor="#ffcccc"
| 4
| May 29
| @ Miami
| L 78–89
| Tayshaun Prince (15)
| Ben Wallace (11)
| Chauncey Billups (7)
| American Airlines Arena20,248
| 1–3
|- align="center" bgcolor="#ccffcc"
| 5
| May 31
| Miami
| W 91–78
| Tayshaun Prince (29)
| Richard Hamilton (10)
| Chauncey Billups (10)
| The Palace of Auburn Hills22,076
| 2–3
|- align="center" bgcolor="#ffcccc"
| 6
| June 2
| @ Miami
| L 78–95
| Richard Hamilton (33)
| Rasheed Wallace (8)
| Chauncey Billups (8)
| American Airlines Arena20,258
| 2–4
|-

Player statistics

Season

Playoffs

Awards and records
Ben Wallace, NBA Defensive Player of the Year Award
Ben Wallace, All-NBA Second Team
Chauncey Billups, All-NBA Second Team
Ben Wallace, NBA All-Defensive First Team
Chauncey Billups, NBA All-Defensive Second Team
Tayshaun Prince, NBA All-Defensive Second Team
Ben Wallace, Allstar reserve
Chauncey Billups, Allstar reserve
Richard Hamilton, Allstar reserve
Rasheed Wallace, Allstar reserve

Transactions

References

Detroit Pistons seasons
Detroit
Detroit
Detroit